Hasanabad (also Romanized as Ḩasanābād; also known as Ḩasanābād-e Ghūrī) is a village in Deh Chah Rural District, Poshtkuh District, Neyriz County, Fars Province, Iran. At the 2006 census, its population was 29, in 8 families.

References 

Populated places in Neyriz County